Alex Luna (born Alexander Tyshchenko, 2 March 1986) is a Ukrainian countertenor singer.

Biography and career 
Alexander Tyshchenko was born on 2 March 1986, in Okhotsk, Khabarovsk Krai (Russian Federation). His father, Viktor, worked as the Head of the Fire Safety at Maritime Fisheries Port. Mother Fania Masgutova studied at the College of Arts in Ufa Pedagogical Institute, Far Eastern Art Institute (Vladivostok), Department of Academic Vocal. She worked at the Opera and Ballet Theatre by N.Sabitova in Ufa. In Okhotsk, she worked as the Head of the Personnel Administration of the village and conducted the home studio of operetta culture. Alex has an older brother Vladimir. In 1995 he moved to Bakhmach (Chernihiv Oblast, Ukraine) with his family, and later in 1999 to Kyiv.

He graduated from the Kyiv Glier Institute of Music in 2005.

In 2003, Alexander Zlotnik cast Alex for one of the leading parts in the first Ukrainian big-budget musical Equator which appeared to be the starting point for many famous singers (there were Svetlana Loboda, Tina Karol, Vasiliy Bondarchuk, Vasiliy Lazarovich in the main cast).

Alex Luna signed his first professional contract with the production center Catapult music in 2007. His first album Svet Luny (Moon Light), was released in December 2008. The album included new compositions but also classic songs performed by Alex (Breakfast at Tiffany's theme, Ave Maria, etc.). However, the album didn't receive appropriate feedback in Ukraine since it was different from the current music market. Nevertheless, it earned success in Germany, Norway, and Switzerland.

The album and his third video were presented in Kyiv City Hall. The video for the Moon Light song was directed and shot by Angel Gracia, famous for his work with Madonna and Enigma. 

Composer and founder of Italian disco Claudio Simonetti were impressed by Alex's voice. Maestro was searching proper singer who could perform in the unusual and mysterious music style of Simonetti. After the composer heard the voice of young Ukrainian talent Alex Luna, he rushed to Kyiv to meet the singer in person.

Alex participated in the ten most prestigious performances in the music world: Gala AIDS Berlin, Leipzig Opera Ball, Dresden Opera Ball, Charity Ball of Almaty, the Viennese Carnival, Tokyo Prestige Hall, etc.

The singer performs with the children's chorus at the annual New Year's Eve ball in Kyiv every year.

Alex Luna has been cooperating with Tuaron Management since 2009 and signed a new professional contract as a result of a trial period. Thanks to the Tuaron Management team led by Anton Sova, he became a full-fledged participant in international show business, is represented in all countries of the world, his work has become large-scale and has successfully joined new trends music.

In 2009 Alex Luna received the Person of the Year award. He also appeared on several magazine covers (10 Days magazine, What's On, Gallery magazine, Beauty and business, Jewellery business magazine). He was also shot for Elle Ukraine, L'Officiel Ukraine, Story magazine, etc. Alex participated in fashion shows during UFW and became the face of Lugaru Fashion House.

His artistic name Alex Luna was created by Angel Gracia while shooting Moon Light video.
Alex moved to Germany in 2010 for work.

Charity 
Alex was one of the Ukrainian singers who participated in the charity auction held at Kyiv Disco Radio Hall in 2008.  The event aimed to collect money for ill children who live and study at boarding schools in Babanka town (Uman Raion).

He also collaborated with the 18-year-old Mariam Reyentenko, who was taking care of the Lyubystok orphanage. Alex invited children to his album presentation event in December 2008 and supported Mariam in educating children.

In September 2011, Alex Luna took part in the Anti AIDS campaign organized by the Ukrainian Ministry of Healthcare. He performed his single Heavens with Vlada Crystal at the event held as part of the campaign.

He also performed at Third Presidential Charity Ball in Almaty (Kazakhstan) and on the opening of the 10th Gala AIDS Ball in Berlin (Germany)

Videos 
 2007 — "Moonlight" (director — Angel Gracia)
 2008 — "Night" (director — Yevgeniy Timokhin)
 2008 — "Ruki k nebesam" (Hands to Heavens) (director — Alexey Fedosov).
 2010 — "Nebesa" (Heavens)

Album 
 2008 — Svet Luny (Moon Light)

Singles 
 2007 — "Moon light"
 2008 — "Night"
 2008 — "Ruki k nebesa" (Hands to Heavens)
 2009 — "Mystery night"
 2010 — "Nebesa" (Heavens)

References

External links 
 Official website Alex Luna
 Official website Tuaron Management
 Official website Anton Sova

1986 births
Living people
21st-century Ukrainian  male singers
R. Glier Kyiv Institute of Music alumni